Đoàn Thị Lâm Oanh (born July 6, 1998) is a member of the Vietnam women's national volleyball team.

Clubs 
  Thông tin Liên Việt Post Bank

Awards

Clubs 
 2016 Vietnam League -  Runner-Up, with Thông tin Liên Việt Post Bank
 2017 Vietnam League -  Runner-Up, with Thông tin Liên Việt Post Bank

National team

U23 team
 2017 Asian Championship -  Bronze Medal
 2019 Asian Championship -  Bronze Medal

References

1998 births
People from Quảng Bình province
Vietnamese women's volleyball players
Living people
Vietnam women's international volleyball players
Competitors at the 2019 Southeast Asian Games
Southeast Asian Games silver medalists for Vietnam
Southeast Asian Games medalists in volleyball
Setters (volleyball)
21st-century Vietnamese women
Competitors at the 2021 Southeast Asian Games